El Aguajito (also called Santa Ana caldera) is a caldera volcano located on the Gulf of California in Mexico.

It is located between the Tres Virgenes volcano and the La Reforma caldera.

References

Landforms of Baja California Sur
Mountains of Mexico
Calderas of Mexico
Gulf of California
Volcanoes of Baja California Sur
Pleistocene calderas